Mina is an unincorporated community in Williams County, in the U.S. state of Ohio. Mina had its start as a water stop on the railroad.

References

Unincorporated communities in Williams County, Ohio
Unincorporated communities in Ohio